Beaulieu is an unincorporated community located in Chatham County, Georgia.  It lies about 12 miles south of downtown Savannah, Georgia, USA. Beaulieu began in the nineteenth century as a summer resort for well-heeled Savannahians. A few old homes remain, but most current structures are more modern.  The village still retains a Deep South atmosphere, with big live oaks covered with Spanish moss.

The primary access road to Beaulieu is Beaulieu Avenue, which runs for approximately 1.1 miles from Whitfield Avenue to Shipyard Road. Today Beaulieu is almost entirely a residential community. The majority of its lots are situated along the Vernon River, a saltwater tidal creek that eventually peters out as it reaches the southside neighborhoods of Savannah.

References

Unincorporated communities in Chatham County, Georgia